Nansha Kalonji (born 16 February 1973) is a Belgian retired footballer who played in both defence and attack. He was most recently the manager of the Rutgers–Newark Scarlet Raiders at Rutgers–Newark.

Player
Kalonji attended Ramapo College where he played on the men's soccer team from 1994 to 1997.  He graduated with a bachelor's degree in social science in 2003.  He was inducted into the school's Hall of Fame in 2007.  He played for the Central Jersey Riptide in the USISL.  In February 1999, the MetroStars selected Kalonji in the third round (thirty-first overall) of the 1999 MLS Supplemental Draft.  He played nineteen games and scored one goal before being released on 23 November 1999.  In 2002 and 2003, he played for the Carolina Dynamo in the fourth division Premier Development League.

Coach
Kalonji began his coaching career as an assistant at Ramapo College.  He then served as an assistant coach at West Orange High School before moving up to become an assistant at Greensboro College in 2002 and 2003.  In 2004, he became the head coach at Rutgers University–Newark.  After posting an 18–32–2 record over three seasons, Kalonji resigned on 4 November 2006.

Kalonji also holds Congolese  and American nationality.

References

1973 births
Living people
Belgian footballers
American people of Democratic Republic of the Congo descent
Belgian football managers
Belgian emigrants to the United States
Belgian sportspeople of Democratic Republic of the Congo descent
Expatriate soccer players in the United States
New York Red Bulls players
Footballers from Brussels
North Carolina Fusion U23 players
Central Jersey Riptide players
Major League Soccer players
USL Second Division players
USL League Two players
New York Red Bulls draft picks
Association football forwards
Association football defenders